Conejo Valley Art Museum is a museum located at Janss Marketplace in Thousand Oaks, California. Established in 1978, the museum showcases fine art, modern art, abstracts, textiles and sculptures. Displays are changing periodically and often include artwork featured on national tours. The museum has hosted art collections from artists such as Howard Brodie, David Rose and Elizabeth Williams. It was previously located in an old library on W. Wilbur Road, but was moved to the Janss Mall in 1990.
.

Exhibitions here have included oil paintings, prehistoric pottery, quilts, photographs, sketches and print making. Its store offers folk art, literature and jewelry.

Conejo Valley Art Museum presents the annual Thousand Oaks ArtWalk, which draws 12-14,000 spectators and includes outdoor art exhibitions and live music.

References

Museums in Ventura County, California
Culture of Thousand Oaks, California
Buildings and structures in Thousand Oaks, California